Aysel Mammadova (born 3 July 1989), known professionally as Aisel is an Azerbaijani singer. She represented  in the Eurovision Song Contest 2018 with the song "X My Heart".

Early life
Mammadova attended the Special Secondary Musical School and the Azerbaijan State Conservatory.

Career
Mammadova participated in the Baku International Jazz Festival in 2005 and 2006, and the Montreux Jazz Festival in 2009. She is a member of the Baku Jazz Center.

Eurovision Song Contest

Mammadova was announced as the Azerbaijani artist for the Eurovision Song Contest 2018 on 8 November 2017. Her entry, "X My Heart", was released on 4 March 2018.

She performed first in the first semi-final on 8 May, placing 11th with 94 points, 14 points behind tenth-place . She received 47 points from both the jury and the televote, receiving 12 points from the  jury. As of the  contest, her entry is the only Azerbaijani entry not to qualify for the final.

In regards to the song, Aisel stated: "I feel a strong connection with the lyrics of the song, since believing in myself made me overcome several difficulties I had in my life. This is a message I want to send to everyone: believing in yourself can make you stronger than cannonballs." However, two years later, she said that she regretted her performance with "X My Heart", and said that she had never actually connected with the song.

References

1989 births
Baku Academy of Music alumni
Eurovision Song Contest entrants for Azerbaijan
21st-century Azerbaijani women singers
Azerbaijani jazz singers
Eurovision Song Contest entrants of 2018
Living people
Musicians from Baku